Ernest William Sansom,  (December 18, 1890 – October 18, 1982) was a Canadian lieutenant-general who was the 3rd ranking commander of Canadian troops in Europe in 1944 during World War II.

World War I military career
Born in Stanley, New Brunswick, he joined the 71st York Regiment of the Canadian Militia in 1906 and was appointed a lieutenant in 1907. During World War I, he fought in the 12th Infantry Battalion and with the Canadian Machine Gun Corps of the Canadian Expeditionary Force. He would command the 1st Battalion of the Canadian Machine Gun Corps. He was awarded the Distinguished Service Order in 1919.

After the war, in 1920, he joined the Permanent Force and went to the Army Staff College in England from 1924 to 1925. He would hold various staff positions in Canada and eventually was promoted to the rank of colonel.

World War II military career
At the start of World War II, in 1939, he was the director of military training. From 1939 to 1940, he was assistant adjutant and quartermaster general for the 1st Canadian Infantry Division in England. After being promoted to major-general in 1940, he commanded the 3rd Canadian Infantry Division. In 1941, he commanded the 5th Armoured Division. He was promoted to lieutenant-general and was appointed the first commander-in-chief of II Canadian Corps effective on January 15, 1943. In 1944, he returned to Canada for medical reasons. In 1945, he was appointed inspector general, Canadian Army Overseas. He was made a Companion of Order of the Bath in 1945. He retired in 1945.

Post war
After the war, he worked for various fund-raising organizations, including the Canadian March of Dimes and the Combined Appeal for the Handicapped.

In the 1945 election, he ran unsuccessfully as the Progressive Conservative candidate for the House of Commons of Canada in the New Brunswick riding of York—Sunbury. He lost again in a 1947 by-election.

He died in Fredericton, New Brunswick, in 1982.

References
 
 
 
Generals of World War II

|-

|-

1890 births
1982 deaths
Canadian Expeditionary Force officers
Canadian military personnel of World War I
Canadian Companions of the Distinguished Service Order
Canadian Companions of the Order of the Bath
People from York County, New Brunswick
Progressive Conservative Party of Canada candidates for the Canadian House of Commons
Candidates in the 1945 Canadian federal election
Canadian Army generals of World War II
Graduates of the Staff College, Camberley
Canadian generals
Canadian Machine Gun Corps officers
Canadian military personnel from New Brunswick